Protein shroom3 also known as shroom-related protein is a protein that in humans is encoded by the SHROOM3 gene.

Protein shroom3 is a PDZ domain-containing protein that belongs to a family of Shroom-related proteins. This protein may be involved in regulating cell shape in certain tissues.

Clinical relevance 

Mutations in this gene have been shown to cause heterotaxy. A similar protein in mice is required for proper neurulation, eye, and gut development.

References

Further reading